Pasni, is a city and a fishing port in Gwadar District, Balochistan, Pakistan. Administratively, Pasni is the headquarters of Pasni Tehsil, the sub-division of Gwadar District. Astola Island lies  ESE of Pasni, in the Arabian Sea. The city of Pasni is itself administratively subdivided into two Union Councils.

Topography

The topography of the area is marked by low jagged hills of the Makran Coastal Range, while flat land is more common towards the coast. Jabal Zarain is a small hill astride a promontory (Cape or Ras Jaddi) south of Pasni and marks the highest point (416' ASL) in the area. The unspoilt and pristine beaches of Pasni offer some of the most enchanting sceneries along the Arabian Sea.  Shadi Kaur (river) fed by adjoining rain water streams, drains into the Arabian Sea just north of the town. Vegetation is sparse and consists mostly of hardy desert shrubs. Most of the non-marine edible products are brought in from Turbat as well as faraway Karachi.

Pasni town, like the rest of Makran Coast, is affected by an active fault (the Makran Accretionary Front) caused by the northward movement (40–50 mm/year) of the Arabian Plate against the Eurasian Plate. Tectonic activity emanating from this subduction zone in the Arabian Sea causes occasional, low intensity quakes. On 28 Nov 1945, a tsunami, triggered by the 1945 Balochistan earthquake, completely destroyed Pasni town.

Demography

The population is predominantly Balochis in Pasni. These Baloch clans include: Kalmati, Bizanjo, etc. who belong to traditional ruling communities and currently, tend to dominate land ownership and the fishing industry. Pasni also has some other tribes such as Barr, Mullahzai,Sanghor, Jadgaal, Wadaila people living in this small town, but the working classes have traditionally comprised Medh, Darzada, Puxh, Maqsoodi and Naqeeb, some of whom are groups that were historically slaves of the ruling families. People of East African ancestry commonly known as Koweeg or 'sheedis' can also be found in Pasni in small numbers; this African lineage is found at low frequency in the rest of Makran, as well as Karachi. 'Sheedis' are mostly descended from female slaves brought in as concubines in the early 19th century, when slave trade flourished under Omani Sultans whose suzerainty extended over Gwadar till 1958.

Facilities

The city houses a modern fish harbour and Port of Pasni, with fishing being the main occupation of the city dwellers. Frozen catch is also sent to Turbat and Karachi for sale in the larger markets.

Pasni Airport is shared by Pakistan Air Force (PAF), Pakistan Navy and civil aviation. PAF as well as PN-Aviation operational facilities are housed nearby. Daily commercial flights link the town with Karachi.

In 2008, the government approved the construction of Shadi Kaur storage dam 50 km north of Pasni, which was inaugurated in September 2017 and is expected to alleviate some of the water deficiency of the region.

History
Other than being a small fishing village, the city does not figure much in history. Alexander the Great is said to have stopped at Pasni (called 'Cysa' in Arrian's treatise Indica) while unsuccessfully trying to rendezvous with his admiral, Nearchus, during a disastrous exodus via Makran after the Indian Campaign (325 BC). According to one theory, Admiral Nearchus' well-stocked fleet was supposed to have continuously provisioned Alexander's army as the latter marched West along the barren coast towards Persia. In the event, a major portion of Alexander's route through Makran (Bela-Averan-Hoshab-Turbat and then south to Pasni-Gwadar) turned out to be much further inland than expected, apparently due to faulty knowledge of the terrain.

An unexplored Harappan-era settlement known as Sokhta Koh is tucked away in the low hills, about 25 km north of Pasni. It is conjectured that this was an ancient Harappan outpost which traded luxury wares with Mesopotamia and Persian Gulf settlements.

The city of Pasni, along with Gwadar, were burned by the Portuguese in 1581, having had some violent encounters with the Kalmatis in the area. The city was attacked again, by Baloch rebels during the 1898 Baloch uprising; the city was looted, and the telegraph lines running to Gwadar severed.

See also 

 Pasni Fish Harbour

References

Coastal cities and towns in Pakistan
Port cities and towns in Pakistan
Populated places in Balochistan, Pakistan